The Midnight Beast is the self-titled debut album from the UK comedy band The Midnight Beast. It was released after the band's sitcom The Midnight Beast aired in 2012. The album was released on CD and to digital music retailers.

Track listing

Charts

References

External links 
 iTunes, The Midnight Beast

2012 debut albums
The Midnight Beast albums
2010s comedy albums